Linfen Campaign (临汾战役) was a series of battles fought between the communists and the nationalists during the Chinese Civil War to control the city of Linfen, and resulted in the communist victory.

Prelude
After the Yuncheng Campaign (运城战役), Linfen was the only nationalist stronghold left in southern Shanxi.  Linfen was ideal to defend: the city wall was 15 metre tall and 10 metre wide at the top, 25 – 30 metres wide at the bottom, and at the section of the Eastern Pass (Dong Guan, 东关), there was a second wall of the same size, providing additional protection.  There were a total of 31 clusters of bunkers around the city and additional strongholds within 3 – 7 km range in the outskirt.  There were deep ditches both outside and inside city wall, and fortifications within the city.  Located on the eastern bank of Fen River, the east, north and south directions were wide open, with little cover for the attacking enemy to hide.

The nationalist strategy was to hold on until reinforcement arrived and then counterattack, while the communist strategy was to take the city primarily using tunnels since the communists lacked heavy artillery pieces.

Order of battle
Defenders totaling 25,000: nationalist order of battle:
The 66th Division deployed in positions outside the city
The 30th Brigade
The artillery battalion of the 27th Brigade
Two Security Brigades
Two Training Regiments
Security forces of adjacent 15 counties withdrew into the city of Linfen
Attackers totaling 53,000: communist order of battle:
The 8th Column
The 13th Column
Units of the Taiyue (太岳) Military District

First stage
The nationalists begun to airlift the 30th Brigade to Luochuan (洛川) from Linfen on March 6, 1948, to strengthen the nationalist force in northwestern China.  In order to prevent this, the communists decided to launch the campaign early and on March 7, 1948, the communist 24th Brigade of the 8th Column took the airfield south of Linfen after destroying two aircraft, thus cutoff the aerial link of the city.  The nationalists were forced to give up the airlift plan and the city was attacked by the enemy from three sides: east, north and south.  The nationalist strongholds in the outskirt of Linfen including Cui Family's Bump (Cui Jia Geda, 崔家疙瘩), Train Station (Huoche Zhan, 火车站), High River Hotel (Gao He Dian, 高河店) and Official Yao's Temple (Yao Guan Miao, 尧官庙) fell into the enemy hands, and the nationalist futile attempt to counterattack and retake these strongholds were beaten back for more than thirty times.  Afterward, the enemy approached the outer city of Linfen, the Eastern Pass (Dong Guan, 东关), which was the barrier for Linfen, and the nationalists desperately attempted to hold on this critical defensive stronghold.

From March 23, 1948 – March 27, 1948, the nationalist defenders twice successfully beaten back the attacks on Eastern Pass (Dong Guan, 东关) by the communist 13th Column.  On April 1, 1948, the enemy adjusted tactic and the communist 37th Brigade of the 13th Column attacked from southeast and the communist 23rd Brigade of the 8th Column attacked from northeast simultaneously, while the 4 tunnels were dug toward the city wall.  On April 10, 1948, three of the four tunnels were filled with explosives and detonated simultaneously, succeeding in collapsing the city wall of the Eastern Pass (Dong Guan, 东关) section, and attacking communist 37th Brigade of the 13th Column and the communist 23rd Brigade of the 8th Column were able to swiftly taking the Eastern Pass (Dong Guan, 东关), the outer city of Linfen, badly mauling the local defenders, the nationalist 66th Division.

Second stage
On April 16, 1948, the battle mostly had switched to underground when the communist 8th Column and Taiyue (太岳) Military District at eastern outskirt of Linfen and the 13th Column at southern outskirt of Linfen begun to dig 15 tunnels toward the city wall and an additional 40+ tunnels for cover.  Taking the lesson learned from the loss of Eastern Pass (Dong Guan, 东关), the defenders also begun to dig tunnels to counter the underground threat.  In addition, under the cover of shelling with incendiary rounds and gas attacks, the nationalist 30th Brigade counterattacked the enemy with air cover.  Although the nationalist counterattack was beaten back the enemy, and the nationalists did succeed in destroying most of the enemy tunnels.

On May 1, 1948, the Xu Xiangqian changed their tactic by deploying the communist 13th Column to the east of the city to assist the communist 8th Column to attack the city, while the 22nd Brigade of the communist 8th Column and the 39th Brigade of the communist 13th Column were deployed to assist the communist regiment of the Taiyue (太岳) Military District on the western bank of the Fen River to blockade the escape route of the fleeing enemy.  On May 16, 1948, the 23rd Brigade of the 8th Column succeeded in extending two 110 metre-long tunnels directly under the city wall, filling one with 6,000 kg black dynamite and the other with 3,500 kg dynamite.  On May 15, 1948, at 7:50 PM, the dynamites were detonated, blowing up two 50 metre wide gaps in the city wall and the assault team of the 69th Regiment of the communist 23rd Brigade was the first to ventured into the city and other communist units soon followed under the cover of heavy artillery fire.  After fierce street fights, the battle ended after midnight when all of the defenders were either killed or captured, and the campaign concluded.

Outcome
The entire nationalist garrison of Linfen was lost, including the Commander-in-chief,  Liang Peihuang 梁培璜, who was captured alive by the enemy.  The fall of Linfen meant that the last nationalist stronghold in southern Shanxi was finally eliminated.  The communist victory of Linfen Campaign resulted in the linking up of the Lüliang communist base and Taiyue (太岳) communist base, and the entire southern Shanxi region falling into the communist hands.  The communist 23rd Brigade of the 8th Column played a significant role in the taking of Linfen and was honored as Linfen Brigade after the campaign.

See also
List of battles of the Chinese Civil War
National Revolutionary Army
History of the People's Liberation Army
Chinese Civil War

References

Zhu, Zongzhen and Wang, Chaoguang, Liberation War History, 1st Edition, Social Scientific Literary Publishing House in Beijing, 2000,  (set)
Zhang, Ping, History of the Liberation War, 1st Edition, Chinese Youth Publishing House in Beijing, 1987,  (pbk.)
Jie, Lifu, Records of the Liberation War: The Decisive Battle of Two Kinds of Fates, 1st Edition, Hebei People's Publishing House in Shijiazhuang, 1990,  (set)
Literary and Historical Research Committee of the Anhui Committee of the Chinese People's Political Consultative Conference, Liberation War, 1st Edition, Anhui People's Publishing House in Hefei, 1987, 
Li, Zuomin, Heroic Division and Iron Horse: Records of the Liberation War, 1st Edition, Chinese Communist Party History Publishing House in Beijing, 2004, 
Wang, Xingsheng, and Zhang, Jingshan, Chinese Liberation War, 1st Edition, People's Liberation Army Literature and Art Publishing House in Beijing, 2001,  (set)
Huang, Youlan, History of the Chinese People's Liberation War, 1st Edition, Archives Publishing House in Beijing, 1992, 
Liu Wusheng, From Yan'an to Beijing: A Collection of Military Records and Research Publications of Important Campaigns in the Liberation War, 1st Edition, Central Literary Publishing House in Beijing, 1993, 
Tang, Yilu and Bi, Jianzhong, History of Chinese People's Liberation Army in Chinese Liberation War, 1st Edition, Military Scientific Publishing House in Beijing, 1993 – 1997,  (Volum 1), 7800219615 (Volum 2), 7800219631 (Volum 3), 7801370937 (Volum 4), and 7801370953 (Volum 5)

Conflicts in 1948
Battles of the Chinese Civil War
1948 in China
Military history of Shanxi